D'Andre is a masculine given name. Notable people with the name include:

 D'Andre Bishop (born 2002), Antiguan association football forward
 D'Andre Goodwin, American football wide receiver and assistant college football coach
 D'Andre Hill (born 1973), American track and field coach and athlete
 D'Andre Swift (born 1999), American football running back
 D'Andre Walker (born 1997), American football linebacker
 D'Andre Wood (born 1988), American football cornerback
 Jordon D'Andre Garrick (born 1998), Jamaican professional footballer
 Tarvaris D'Andre Jackson (1983–2020), American football quarterback

D'Andre (or d'André) is also a surname, but is much less common than the given name.
 Antoine Balthazar Joachim d'André (1759–1825), French royalist politician

See also
 DeAndre, given name
 Andre, given name

Masculine given names